F1 Engine may refer to:
Rocketdyne F-1, a type of gas-generator cycle rocket engine
The engine of a Formula One racing car